Vincent Taylor may refer to:

Vincent A. Taylor (1845–1922), U.S. Representative from Ohio
Vincent Taylor (musician), American guitar player with Sha Na Na
Vince Taylor (1939–1991), British singer
Vincent Taylor (theologian) (1887–1968), Methodist biblical scholar and theologian
Vince Taylor (bodybuilder) (born 1956), American bodybuilder
Vincent Taylor (American football), American football player